Phelipara confusa is a species of beetle in the family Cerambycidae. It was described by Schwarzer in 1931.

References

Agapanthiini
Beetles described in 1931